Midan Hawally Is one of the districts of Salmiya in Kuwait City, Kuwait. The population of the District is 200,000. The district is also close to Hawalli. The District Is full of Mosques.

Populated places in Kuwait
Areas of Hawalli Governorate
Suburbs of Kuwait City